Osiyan railway station is a railway station in Jodhpur district, Rajasthan. Its code is OSN. It serves Osiyan town. The station consists of a single platform. Passenger, Express and Superfast trains halt here.

References

Railway stations in Jodhpur district
Jodhpur railway division